Akbar Salim Anarkali is a 1978 Indian Telugu-language historical romance film produced & directed by N. T. Rama Rao under his Ramakrishna Cine Studios banner. The film stars Rama Rao, Nandamuri Balakrishna and Deepa, with music composed by C. Ramchandra. It is based on the legend of the romance between the Mughal prince Salim (later known as Jahangir) and the court dancer Anarkali, which is disapproved of by the emperor Akbar. The film was unsuccessful.

Plot 
Akbar, who does not have a male heir, undertakes a pilgrimage to a shrine to pray that his wife Jodha give birth to a son. Later, Tansen the singer in his court, brings the emperor news of his son's birth. Overjoyed at his prayers being answered Akbar gives Tansen his ring and promises to grant him anything he desires. Here, Salim grows as a spoiled brat, flippant and self-indulgent. So, Akbar sends him off to war, to teach him courage and discipline. After 14 years, Salim returns as a distinguished soldier and falls in love with court-dancer Nadira, whom the emperor bestows on her the title Anarkali, meaning "pomegranate blossom". Knowing it,  Gulnar, another dancer of a higher rank, envies as she too aspires to possess the prince's love but fails. So, she uncovers their forbidden relationship with the Emperor. At present, Salim pleads with his father for acceptance of their espousal, but he refuses and imprisons Anarkali.

Salim rebels and amasses an army to confront Akbar to rescue Anarkali. Defeated, Salim is sentenced to death by his father but is told that the sentence will be revoked if Anarkali, now in hiding, is handed over to die in his place. Anarkali gives herself up to save the prince's life and is condemned to death by being entombed alive. Before her sentence is carried out, she begs to have a few hours with Salim as his make-believe wife. Her request is granted, as she has agreed to drug Salim so that he cannot interfere with her entombment. As Anarkali is being walled up, Akbar is reminded that he still owes Tansen a favour, as it was he who brought him news of Salim's birth. He pleads for Anarkali's life. Akbar has a change of opinion, but although he wants to release Anarkali he cannot, because of his duty to his country. He, therefore, arranges for her secret escape into exile with Tansen but demands that the pair are to live in obscurity and that Salim is never to know that Anarkali is still alive.

Cast 
N. T. Rama Rao as Akbar
Jamuna as Jodha
Nandamuri Balakrishna as Salim
Deepa as Anarkali
Gummadi as Tansen
Sreedhar
Madhavi as Gulnar
P. J. Sarma
Chalapathi Rao

Soundtrack 
Music was composed by C. Ramchandra. Lyrics was written by C. Narayana Reddy.

References

External links 
 

1970s historical romance films
Cultural depictions of Akbar
Cultural depictions of Jahangir
Films about courtesans in India
Films directed by N. T. Rama Rao
Films scored by C. Ramchandra
Films set in the 14th century
Films set in the Mughal Empire
Indian historical romance films